This is a list of mayors of the city of Vevey, Switzerland.

Vevey
 
Vevey